The 1917–18 season was Manchester City F.C.'s twenty-seventh season of league football.

Owing to the War, once again Manchester City played non-competitive war league football. In the principal tournament they contested the Lancashire Section, while in the four-team subsidiary tournament they contested the Group B of the Lancashire Section.

Team Kit

War Leagues

Principal Tournament

Lancashire Section

Results summary

N.B. Points awarded for a win: 2

Reports

Subsidiary Tournament

Lancashire Section, Group B

Results summary

N.B. Points awarded for a win: 2

Reports

Squad statistics

Squad
Appearances for competitive matches only

Scorers

All

Principal Tournament

Subsidiary Tournament

See also
Manchester City F.C. seasons

References

External links
Extensive Manchester City statistics site

Manchester City F.C. seasons
Manchester City F.C.